Cory Procter (born October 18, 1982) is a former American football guard in the National Football League (NFL) for the Detroit Lions, Dallas Cowboys and Miami Dolphins. He played college football at the University of Montana. He currently owns and runs Pro Capital Wealth Management as well as speaks for different organizations.

Early years
Procter attended Gig Harbor High School and was a letterman in football and wrestling. In football, he was twice named the team MVP and as a senior, he earned All-League offensive lineman, All-Area, All-State, and All-Northwest honors. In wrestling, he was twice named the team MVP.

He accepted a football scholarship to play for the University of Montana, where he became a four-year starter with 42 consecutive starts (47 total). He started 5 games at right tackle as a freshman, because of injuries on the offensive line and contributed to the team winning the Division I-AA National Championship. As a sophomore, he was moved to left guard. As a junior and senior, he returned to play right tackle.

Professional career

Detroit Lions
Procter was signed as an undrafted free agent by the Detroit Lions after the 2005 NFL Draft on April 28. He was waived and later signed to the team's practice squad on September 4.

Dallas Cowboys
On November 30, 2005, he was signed by the Dallas Cowboys from the Detroit Lions' practice squad. He was activated for the last 2 games of the season, but he did not see any playing time.

In 2006, he was declared inactive in all of the games, while being a backup at guard and center. In 2007, he played in all 16 games as part of the special teams units and started 2 contests at center in place of Andre Gurode who had a knee injury.

In 2008, he started 11 games at left guard in place of an injured Kyle Kosier, but didn't fare well with the extended playing time, specially against power rushers. He was waived on May 16, 2010.

Miami Dolphins
On May 24, 2010, he was signed by the Miami Dolphins as a free agent, reuniting with former Cowboys head coach Bill Parcells, who was the team's Executive Vice President of Football Operations. He was released on September 5. On September 9, he was re-signed to replace center Jake Grove. On November 20, he was placed on the injured reserve list after rupturing the patellar tendon in his left knee during the tenth game against the Chicago Bears.

Personal life
Procter was the drummer for the metal band Free Reign, a project also involving Cowboys linemen Marc Colombo and Leonard Davis. He has also appeared on the VH1 reality show Rock and Roll Fantasy Camp.

References

1982 births
Living people
People from Gig Harbor, Washington
Players of American football from Washington (state)
American football offensive guards
American football centers
Montana Grizzlies football players
Detroit Lions players
Dallas Cowboys players
Miami Dolphins players